Golshahr (also Romanized as Gol Shahr) is a city in the Central District of Golpayegan County, Isfahan Province, Iran.  At the 2006 census, its population was 9,966, in 2,865 families.

References

Populated places in Golpayegan County

Cities in Isfahan Province